Ein Hawd is an Arab village in northern Israel. Located on the foot of Mount Carmel, near Haifa, it falls under the jurisdiction of Hof HaCarmel Regional Council.

History
The village was established following the 1948 Arab–Israeli War when 35 members of the Abu al-Hija family from the depopulated village of Ayn Hawd (now Ein Hod) returned to the village lands after being released from an Israeli prisoner of war camp, refused to leave the area and settled on the village lands. They established a new village. Initially the Israeli approved name given to the village by locals was Kfar Abu al-Hija. In 1978 the villagers were able to reclaim the name Ein Hawd. Attempts to dislodge them did not succeed, and they were eventually granted Israeli citizenship. Initially, the new village was not recognized, but in 1988 it joined the Association of Unrecognized Arab Villages in Israel and was recognized by the state in 1992. In 2005, Ein Hawd achieved full recognition, including connection to the Israeli electric grid.

In 1978 the village began removing the fence that Israeli authorities had surrounded the village with in 1964, to build 24 new houses. The Markovitch Commission report banded all buildings in Ein Houd as "grey" which froze all repairs to the village housing stock.

Since Ein Hawd was recognized by the Israeli government, the village has joined the Hof HaCarmel Regional Council and urban planning is under way. In an interview, the village's mayor, Mohammed Abu al-Hija, was hopeful that these changes would be for the better: "It is true that many years have gone by, but this is a great achievement for everyone, a big step forward. The State of Israel has finally applied a policy of equality to us and I am hopeful that this will prove to be the case for other villages that are in similar situations as well...It helps to convince me that equality is attainable, no matter how difficult it may seem."

One Land
In 2004, the Foundation for Achieving Seamless Territory (FAST) organized an international architecture and design competition for the development of an alternative master plan for Ein Hawd. More than 100 plans from more than 30 countries were received. The winners of the competition, a group of architects and designers from France, Germany and Israel have developed what they believe is a sustainable solution for the village. The project is divided into two parts, "One Land,"  a continuation of One Land Two Systems project, and an art show, "Platform Paradise."

The One Land program consists of an alternative master plan; a landscape plan; the Golden Heart Pavilion as the first community building in Ein Hawd; a market combining agriculture, tourism, aesthetics and local hospitality; a restaurant called Habait, or el-Beit (The Home); a school and community center; an exhibit of the history of the village; a hotel and an outdoor cinema.

See also
 Arab localities in Israel
 Population displacements in Israel after 1948

References

External links
Ein Hud Restaurant, Archnet Digital Library

Arab villages in Israel
Populated places established in 1948
Populated places in Haifa District